The Space Book is an album by American jazz saxophonist Booker Ervin featuring performances recorded in 1964 for the Prestige label, with his quartet including Jaki Byard on piano, Richard Davis on bass, and Alan Dawson on drums.

Reception
The Allmusic review by Scott Yanow awarded the album 4½ stars and stated: "This CD is a fine example of Booker Ervin's unique style".

Track listing
All compositions by Booker Ervin except as noted

 "Number Two" - 8:18
 "I Can't Get Started" (Vernon Duke, Ira Gershwin) - 9:40
 "Mojo" - 10:29
 "There Is No Greater Love" (Isham Jones, Marty Symes) - 7:09

Personnel
Booker Ervin - tenor saxophone
Jaki Byard - piano
Richard Davis - bass
Alan Dawson - drums

References

Prestige Records albums
Booker Ervin albums
1965 albums
Albums recorded at Van Gelder Studio
Albums produced by Don Schlitten